The following is a list of the spouses of Wisconsin governors from 1933 to present, a position that is styled as First Lady or First Gentleman of the State of Wisconsin. As of 2017, there have been no female governors of the State of Wisconsin, and all first spouses have been first ladies.

References

Sources 
 Wisconsin Historical Society

Lists of Wisconsin politicians

Lists of spouses
Governor of Wisconsin